The Siemens Inspiro is a family of electric multiple units designed and manufactured by Siemens since 2012 for metro systems. The product was launched on 19 September 2012 at the InnoTrans in Berlin. The first Inspiro entered service with Warsaw Metro on 6 October 2013.

Genesis 
In October 2009, Siemens Mobility started development on a new subway product family. It collaborated with DesignworksUSA on design aspects. The company based its design on Modular Metro vehicles previously produced for Vienna, Oslo and Nuremberg.

Metros using Siemens Inspiro technology

Poland 
Warsaw Metro in service 6-car trainsets configuration

Germany 

MVG has ordered first 21 six-carriage trains for the Munich U-Bahn in November 2010 (Class C2.11) with second option of 22 units in 2019 (Class C2.12) and third option of 24 units in 2020 (Class C2.13), bringing the total number to 67. MVG has designated the trains as Class C2, differentiating them from C1, which wasn't based on Inspiro. The delivery began in 2012 with the last unit to be delivered in 2024.

VAG ordered 21 four-carriage trains for the Nuremberg U-Bahn in 2015, designated as G1, with the first entry into revenue service in 2020.

Malaysia 
Rapid KL - Kajang line in service 4-car trainsets configuration

Bulgaria 
30 new metro 3-car trainsets have been ordered for the M3 line of the Sofia Metro to enter into service April 2020. The contract includes an option for 30 additional cars to extend these trains to 4 cars long.

Saudi Arabia 
Riyadh Metro upcoming 2-car and 4-car trainsets configuration for Line 1 and Line 2.

United Kingdom 

Siemens was awarded a contract worth £1.5bn for 94 9-car sets based on the Inspiro to replace the existing 1973 Stock used on the Piccadilly line of the London Underground. The first of the type is expected to enter service in 2025. There are also options for a total of 250 trains allowing replacement of all existing trains on the deep-level Central, Waterloo & City and Bakerloo lines.

Gallery

See also 
 Alstom Metropolis and Movia

References

External links 
 Siemens Inspiro product page
 Siemens Inspiro brochure

Siemens multiple units